Krom Ngoy (born Ouk Ou; 1865 – 1936) was a Cambodian poet and a master of khsae diev. His fame spread to Thailand at that time, not now and he was invited to sing for the then Thai King. He was well liked by the king and officials and was entitled "Phai-ros Loe Koern" in Thai or "Phirum Pheasa Ou" in Khmer which would mean one who is excellent in the use of language.

He generally included issues relevant to ways of life of the people then in his songs or poetic teachings. They include: working in the farm to earn a living, choosing a spouse, poverty and its causes, ignorance of the people, consequences of laziness and inactiveness, dominance of foreigners on Khmer people, the loss of sovereignty, and the decline of the Khmer culture and literature.

He was called for an audience with and sing for the King Sisowath of Cambodia and was given a title as “Neak Preah Phee-rom Pheasa Ou” unofficially translated as the elevated one who is excellent or perfect in the use of language. Ou was his name, but later on was given another name by the King to Ngoy in order not to duplicate with another royal official whose name was also Ou.
His educational poems were delivered in voice form and not recorded. He was later on invited by the then director of the Buddhist Institute in Phnom Penh, Ms Suzanne Karpeles, to sing his poems in a slow phase so that his wisdom could be written down for later generations. His poetic teachings have been published by the Buddhist Institute.

His wife’s name was In and he had six sons namely Doung, Cheng, Cha, Chen, Chong, and Chev. His 5th son, inherited his talent and was called Aja Chong. Aja refers to a teacher, a wise elder, the one who is knowledgeable in his subject, particularly literature or religion.

Ouk Ou died at the age of 71, because of constipation, on Friday, the 6th day of the waxing moon, 2479 Buddhist year or 1936 AD.

Reference: Krom Ngoy’s Codes of Conduct, The Buddhist Institute, 1972

1865 births
1936 deaths
Cambodian poets
People from Kandal province
20th-century Cambodian writers
19th-century Cambodian writers

Cambodian male writers